The Soviet Tankmen's Song is a popular Russian song, the final variant of which was popularized by the Soviet 1968 film At War as at War, about the crew of an SU-100 (SU-85 in the basic novel) tank destroyer. The song has no official title and is referred to by its first line: Na Polye Tanki Grokhotali.  The song melody originated from the old Russian miners' song "Sirens Sounded Alarm" ("Гудки тревожно прогудели"), popularized in the 1940 film "Big life". The lyrics of the song were replaced during World War II.

See also 
 March of the Soviet Tankmen

References

Russian military songs
Soviet songs
Songs about soldiers
Film theme songs
Tanks
Eastern Front (World War II)